Mutilva Alta (in Spanish) or Mutiloagoiti (in Basque) is a town south of Pamplona in Navarre, Spain. It belongs to the municipality of Aranguren.

Municipalities in Navarre